Utah State Route 70 may refer to:

 Utah State Route 70, the state highway designation (legislative overlay) for Interstate 70 in Utah, United States, that runs through Millard, Sevier, Emery, and Grand counties
 By Utah State law, Interstate 70 within the state has been defined as "State Route 70" since 1977
 Utah State Route 70 (1931-1977), a former state highway in northwestern Box Elder County, Utah, United States, that connected the Nevada State Route 233 at the Nevada state line (west-northwest of Lucin) with Utah State Route 42 (east of Cedar Creek), by way of Park Valley

See also

 List of state highways in Utah
 List of Interstate Highways in Utah
 List of named highway junctions in Utah
 List of highways numbered 70

External links

 Utah Department of Transportation Highway Resolutions: Route 70 (PDF)